Alexandre Clément (born 23 March 1975) is a French former professional footballer who played as a defender. He was most recently the manager of Le Mans, a post he held from 2014 to 2015.

External links
Alexandre Clément profile at footballdatabase.eu

1975 births
Living people
French footballers
Association football defenders
FC Metz players
Amiens SC players
AS Beauvais Oise players
Stade Malherbe Caen players
R.W.D.M. Brussels F.C. players
Ligue 1 players
Belgian Pro League players
French football managers
AS Beauvais Oise managers